{{DISPLAYTITLE:C5H6S}}
The molecular formula C5H6S may refer to:

 Methylthiophenes
 2-Methylthiophene, an organosulfur compound that can be produced by Wolff-Kishner reduction of thiophene-2-carboxaldehyde
 3-Methylthiophene, an organosulfur that  can be produced by sulfidation of 2-methylsuccinate
 Thiopyran, a heterocyclic compound